Thylacodes masier is a species of sea snail, a marine gastropod mollusk in the family Vermetidae, the worm snails or worm shells.

Description

Distribution

References

External links
 Deshayes, G. P.; Milne-Edwards, H. (1843). Histoire Naturelle des Animaux sans Vertèbres, présentant les caractères généraux et particuliers de ces animaux, leur distribution, leurs classes, leurs familles, leurs genres, et la citation des principales espèces qui s'y rapportent, par J.B.P.A. de Lamarck. Deuxième édition, Tome neuvième. Histoire des Mollusques. 728 pp. J. B. Baillière: Paris
 Keen M. (1961). A proposed reclassification of the gastropod family Vermetidae. Bulletin of the British Museum, Natural History (Zoology), 7(3): 183-213, pls. 54-55

Vermetidae
Gastropods described in 1843